"En Mi Cuarto" is a song by Puerto Rican rapper Jhayco and American record producer Skrillex. It was released as a single on July 30, 2021. The song was written and produced by Jhayco, Skrillex and Tainy. It is from his second album, Timelezz.

Composition 
The song is written in the key of G♭ Minor, with a tempo of 115 beats per minute.

Critical reception 
Ariel King of Dancing Astronaut commented the song has "smooth beat matches Cortez’s crisp vocal flow, creating a slinking track that’s fit for packed nightclubs." Ellie Mullins of We Rave You thought it "is a perfect anthem for the late summer nights or for a tropical DJ set with the sunset as the background."

Music video 
An accompanying music video was released on July 30, 2021, directed by Stillz, and starring Mia Khalifa. The characteristic of video is "thrilling shots of Cortez on a motorcycle and partying in the back of a fast-moving truck." and ends with "Skrillex and Cortez party in a room that bursts into flames."

Credits and personnel 
Credits adapted from AllMusic.

 Jhayco – composer, primary artist, voices
 Skrillex – composer, primary artist, producer, voices
 Tainy – composer, producer

Charts

Weekly charts

Year-end charts

Certifications

References 

2021 songs
2021 singles
Jhayco songs
Skrillex songs
Songs written by Skrillex
Songs written by Tainy
Song recordings produced by Skrillex
Song recordings produced by Tainy
Universal Music Latino singles